Shivam Road is a major commercial and residential area in Amberpet, Hyderabad, Telangana, India. This area is named after the Shivam Temple which houses a large shiva lingam, with the foundation stone laid by Satya Sai Baba.

Commercial Area
This area is thriving with shopping complexes, restaurants, grocery stores, etc. It also houses a part and entrance of the eminent Osmania University (OU Gate).

It also has many prominent temples in and around the area such as Ahobila Mutt and Ayyappa Swamy Temple. The Ayyappa Swamy Temple is well known for Ayyappa Puja in the month of December and January while the Ahobila Mutt is a noted temple of Lord Narasimha. Other prominent temples in the area include Ramalayam, Shirdi Sai Baba Temple & Lingala Gadda Shiva Temple.

Transport
Shivam Road is well connected by TSRTC buses, having situated near the heart of the city.

The closest MMTS Train station is at Vidya nagar.

Schools & Educational Institutions
There are many good schools and educational institutions in this area. Some of the higher learning institutes are
 ATI (Advanced Training Institute)
 Hyderabad institute of Physics (HIP)
Some of the famous schools are
 Sri Aurobindo International School (ICSE)
 The Mother's Integral School
 Sri Sathya Sai Vidhya Vihar High School
 Narayana E Techno School
Some of the famous Intermediate colleges are
 Sarath Junior College
 Chaitanya Junior College

Osmania University is adjacent to D.D. Colony and is the oldest in Hyderabad and one of the oldest in India. This area also has a noted law college, College Of Law For Women.

There are many small enterprises, including book stores (Vishal Book Store, Bhavani Bookstall), many medical stores (Harish, Apollo & Bhavani Medical Stores). It also has a vegetable market as well as many general stores and businesses of various kinds.

Restaurants
There are many good restaurants in this area. Some of them are
 Seasons
 Papaji-da-Dhaba
 Surabhi Grand
 Shade Restaurant
 Hotel Raghavendra Vegetarian Hotel
 Hotel Shanthi Delux Pure Vegetarian Hotel
 Bakers' Q
 US Pizza
 Subway
 Baskin-Robbins Ice Cream
 Just Bake
 Yo pizza

Banks
There are many banks and ATMs in this area.
 OBC ATM
 Indian Bank & ATM
 SBI & ATM
 Syndicate Bank & ATM
 Corporation Bank & ATM
 Karur Vysya Bank & ATM
 Telangana Grameena Bank

Hospitals
This area also has many noted hospitals
 Shantilal Navodaya Multi-speciality Hospital
 Seasons Multi-speciality Hospital
 Tilak Nagar Hospital
 Durgabai Deshmukh Hospital and Research Centre
 Sir Ronald Ross Institute of Tropical and Communicable Diseases (also known as Fever Hospital)

References

Neighbourhoods in Hyderabad, India